Témiscouata is a regional county municipality in the Bas-Saint-Laurent region of Quebec, Canada. It is located southeast of Rivière-du-Loup, bordering New Brunswick, and is centred on Lake Témiscouata.  Its seat is Témiscouata-sur-le-Lac.

Major industries include forestry, agriculture and maple syrup products.

Subdivisions
There are 19 subdivisions within the RCM:

Cities & Towns (3)
Dégelis
Pohénégamook
Témiscouata-sur-le-Lac

Municipalities (12)
Auclair
Biencourt
Lac-des-Aigles
Lejeune
Rivière-Bleue
Saint-Athanase
Saint-Elzéar-de-Témiscouata
Saint-Honoré-de-Témiscouata
Saint-Jean-de-la-Lande
Saint-Juste-du-Lac
Saint-Michel-du-Squatec
Saint-Pierre-de-Lamy

Parishes (4)
Packington
Saint-Eusèbe
Saint-Louis-du-Ha! Ha!
Saint-Marc-du-Lac-Long

Demographics

Population

Language

Transportation

Access routes
Highways and numbered routes that run through the municipality, including external routes that start or finish at the county border:

Autoroutes

Principal highways

Secondary highways

External routes

See also
 List of regional county municipalities and equivalent territories in Quebec

References

External links
Official website